Abdulieh Janneh (also spelled Abdoulie, born 8 March 1970) is a Gambian sprinter. He competed in the men's 4 × 100 metres relay at the 1992 Summer Olympics.

References

External links
 
 
 

1970 births
Living people
Athletes (track and field) at the 1992 Summer Olympics
Gambian male sprinters
Olympic athletes of the Gambia
Place of birth missing (living people)